Aleksey Vasilyevich Sorokin (30 March 1931  11 January 1976) was a member of the Soviet cosmonaut program.

References 

1931 births
1976 deaths
Soviet cosmonauts